The Kampili kingdom was a short-lived Hindu kingdom of early 14th-century in the Deccan region. The kingdom existed near Ballari and Tungabhadra river in northeastern parts of the present-day Karnataka state, India. It ended after a defeat by the armies of Delhi Sultanate, and a jauhar (ritual mass suicide) in 1327/28 CE when it faced a certain defeat. The Kampili kingdom in some historical accounts is called the Basnaga kingdom, and as what inspired and ultimately led to the Hindu Vijayanagara Empire.

History
The founder of the kingdom was a Hoysala commander, Singeya Nayaka-III (1280–1300 AD), who declared independence after the Muslim forces of the Delhi Sultanate defeated and captured the territories of the Seuna Yadavas of Devagiri in 1294 CE. Nayaka-III was succeeded by his son Kampilideva in 1300, who remained in dispute with the territorial claims of Delhi Sultanate. The Kampili kingdom finally fell to the invasion in 1327/28 CE from the north by the forces of Muhammad bin Tughluq, the Sultan of Delhi. The triumphant army led by Malik Zada sent the news of its victory, over Kampili kingdom, to Muhammad bin Tughluq in Delhi by sending a straw-stuffed severed head of the dead Hindu king. From the ruins of the Kampili kingdom, soon rose the Vijayanagara Empire in 1336 CE, and grew into one of the famed empires of India that ruled Southern India for over 200 years.

Gallery

See also 

 Kammata Durga, the capital of the Kampili kingdom
 Kampilideva, the last Kampili king, father of Kumara Rama
 Kumara Rama, a Kampili prince

References

Hoysala Empire
History of Karnataka